Fraser Lake Water Aerodrome  is located on Fraser Lake, British Columbia, Canada.

See also
Fraser Lake Airport

References

Seaplane bases in British Columbia
Regional District of Bulkley-Nechako
Registered aerodromes in British Columbia